Route 123 is a mostly North/South provincial highway in the Canadian province of New Brunswick. The road runs from Route 10 in Chipman. The road has a length of approximately 52 kilometres, and services small, otherwise isolated rural communities. In these areas, the highway is often unofficially referred to as "Main  Street."  The Highway is known as Main Street and McLeod Avenue in Chipman. The road is then known as Grand Lake Road from Gaspereau Forks to Doaktown. Lastly upon entering Doaktown, the road is named South Road.

History

The Grand Lake Road was upgraded and completed in the early 1970s. It, along with a former section of Route 116 between Gaspereau Forks and Chipman, became Route 123 in 1976.

Intersecting routes
 Begins at a sharp corner of Route 10 in Chipman as known as Main Street
Crosses to Route 116 in Gaspereau Forks
 Ending in Doaktown

River crossings
 Hutchinson Brook in Chipman
 Salmon River in Gaspereau Forks
 Gaspereau River
 Cains River

Communities along the Route
Chipman
Red Bank
Gaspereau Forks
Upper Gaspereau
Grand Lake Road
Doaktown

See also
List of New Brunswick provincial highways

References

123
123
123
123